Impairment may refer to:

 In health, any loss or difference of physiological, psychological, or anatomical structure or function, whether permanent or temporary. Identifying impairments that contribute to disability is a key factor for a health professional to determine appropriate treatment.
 In accounting, the decrease in the net asset value of an asset due to the carrying amount of the asset exceeding the recoverable amount thereof. The effect of impairment constitutes the decrease in asset values per the Statement of Financial Position and a corresponding amount recognised through profit or loss in respect of the impairment loss.
 A classification of poor water quality for a surface water body under the U.S. Clean Water Act

it:menomazione